The Eighteenth Emergency EP is an EP released by Butcher Boy on 3 September 2007 on HDIF Records. 

The EP featured two new songs, "The Eighteenth Emergency" and "React or Die", and two reworked offerings from their debut LP Profit in Your Poetry: "There Is No-One Who Can Tell You Where You've Been" and "Keep Your Powder Dry".

"React or Die" is the title track of the band's second LP.

Track listing
"There Is No-One Who Can Tell You Where You've Been"
"React or Die"
"Keep Your Powder Dry"
"The Eighteenth Emergency"

References

2007 EPs